Jeremiah Wells (born October 30, 1986) is an American mixed martial artist who competes in the Welterweight division of the Ultimate Fighting Championship.

Background
Wells was born in 1986 in West Hazelton, Pennsylvania, a city of about 25,000, nearby Philadelphia. Growing up a variety of sports, ranging from football, basketball and soccer, he eventually settled into breeding dogs to sell and working at a factory to support his child. He started training MMA at the age of 24 and fell in love with it, pursuing it as a career.

Mixed martial arts career

Early career
Wells competed as an amateur middleweight from 2011 to 2012, amassing a 2–1 record.

Making his professional MMA debut at PA Cage Fight 14, he scored a first-round TKO against Quinton Stephens, before submitting his next two opponents, Bradley Desir and Scott Hudson, via second round rear-naked chokes. He would then compete for the Cage Fury FC Welterweight Championship against Emmanuel Wallo at CFFC 56, which he would lose by unanimous decision. After drawing with Bassil Hafez at CFFC 69, Wells would rebound, chocking out Gary Balletto Jr in the first round at CES MMA 49. Wells would then defeat The Ultimate Fighter season 16 alumni Jon Manley via unanimous decision at CES MMA 50, before winning by unanimous decision against Jason Norwood in the main event of CES MMA 52 for the CES MMA Welterweight Championship. Losing the championship in the next bout at CES MMA 52 against future Bellator fighter Vinicius de Jesus via unanimous decision, Wells knocked out Mumia Abu Dey-Ali in the first round att CFFC 76. In his final bout before the UFC, Wells submitted Marco Smallman in the second round at CFFC 78.

Ultimate Fighting Championship

In his UFC debut, Wells faced Warlley Alves, replacing Ramazan Emeev, on June 26, 2021,  at UFC Fight Night: Gane vs. Volkov. Wells won the fight via knockout in round two.

Wells was scheduled to face Jake Matthews on December 4, 2021, at UFC on ESPN 31. However, just hours before the event the bout was cancelled after one of Wells's cornermen tested positive for COVID-19.

His second fight in UFC, Wells faced Mike Mathetha, replacing Orion Cosce on February 12, 2022, at UFC 271. He won the fight via technical submission in round one.

Wells faced Court McGee on June 18, 2022, at UFC on ESPN: Kattar vs. Emmett. He won the bout in the first round, knocking out McGee with a left hook. This win earned him his first Performance of the Night award.

Championships and accomplishments
 Cage Fury Fighting Championships
 Cage Fury FC Welterweight Championship (one time; former)
 CES MMA
 CES MMA Welterweight Championship (one time; former)
 Ultimate Fighting Championship
Performance of the Night (One time)

Mixed martial arts record

|-
|Win
|align=center|11–2–1
|Court McGee
|KO (punch)
|UFC on ESPN: Kattar vs. Emmett
|
|align=center| 1
|align=center| 1:34
|Austin, Texas, United States
|
|-
|Win
|align=center|
|Mike Mathetha
|Technical Submission (rear-naked choke)
|UFC 271
|
|align=center|1 
|align=center|4:38 
|Houston, Texas, United States
|
|-
|Win
|align=center|9–2–1
|Warlley Alves
|KO (punches)
|UFC Fight Night: Gane vs. Volkov
|
|align=center|2
|align=center|0:30
|Las Vegas, Nevada, United States
|
|-
|Win
|align=center|8–2–1
|Marco Smallman
|Submission (rear-naked choke)
|CFFC 78
|
|align=center|2
|align=center|2:51
|Philadelphia, Pennsylvania, United States  
|
|-
|Win
|align=center|7–2–1
|Mumia Abu Dey-Ali
|KO (punch)
|CFFC 76
|
|align=center|1
|align=center|0:22
|Bensalem, Pennsylvania, United States 
|
|-
|Loss
|align=center|6–2–1
|Vinicius de Jesus
|Decision (unanimous)
|CES MMA 55
|
|align=center|5
|align=center|5:00
|Hartford, Connecticut, United States
|
|-
|Win
|align=center|6–1–1
|Jason Norwood
|Decision (unanimous)
|CES MMA 52
|
|align=center|5
|align=center|5:00
|Philadelphia, Pennsylvania, United States 
|
|-
|Win
|align=center|5–1–1
|Jon Manley
|Decision (unanimous)
|CES MMA 50
|
|align=center|3 
|align=center|5:00 
|Lincoln, Rhode Island, United States 
|
|-
|Win
|align=center|4–1–1
|Gary Balletto Jr.
|KO (punch)
|CES MMA 49
|
|align=center|1
|align=center|0:57
|Lincoln, Rhode Island, United States
|
|-
|Draw
|align=center|3–1–1
|Bassil Hafez
|Draw (split)
|CFFC 68
|
|align=center|3 
|align=center|5:00
|Atlantic City, New Jersey, United States
|
|-
|Loss
|align=center|3–1
|Emmanuel Walo
|Decision (unanimous)
|CFFC 56
|
|align=center|5 
|align=center|5:00 
|Philadelphia, Pennsylvania, United States
|
|-
|Win
|align=center|3–0
|Bradley Desir
|Submission (rear-naked choke)
|CFFC 44
|
|align=center|2
|align=center|4:35
|Bethlehem, Pennsylvania, United States
|
|-
|Win
|align=center| 2–0
|Scott Hudson
|Submission (rear-naked choke)
|PA Cage Fight 16
|
|align=center|2
|align=center|0:56
|Scranton, Pennsylvania, United States
|
|-
|Win
|align=center|1–0
|Quinton Stephens
|TKO (punches)
|PA Cage Fight 14
|
|align=center|1 
|align=center|4:40 
|Hazleton, Pennsylvania, United States
|
|-

See also 
 List of current UFC fighters
 List of male mixed martial artists

References

External links 
  
 

1986 births
Living people
American male mixed martial artists
Welterweight mixed martial artists
Mixed martial artists utilizing Brazilian jiu-jitsu
Ultimate Fighting Championship male fighters
American practitioners of Brazilian jiu-jitsu